Oliver John Douglas Pope (born 2 January 1998) is an English professional cricketer who plays for the England cricket team and Surrey County Cricket Club. He is a right-handed batsman who occasionally plays as a wicket-keeper. He made his Test debut in 2018.

Domestic career
Pope attended Cranleigh School and is the great-great-great-great-grandson of the school's first headmaster, Joseph Merriman. He played club cricket for both Guildford and Cranleigh Cricket Clubs and was a member of Surrey age-group sides.

On 26 August 2016, Pope signed a two-year professional contract with Surrey. Two days later, he made his List A debut for Surrey in the semi-final of the 2016 Royal London One-Day Cup against Yorkshire.

He made his first-class debut on 28 March 2017 for Surrey against Oxford MCCU as part of the Marylebone Cricket Club University fixtures. Pope scored his maiden List A half-century on 7 May 2017 against Sussex. He made his Twenty20 debut for Surrey in the 2017 NatWest t20 Blast on 7 July 2017. Pope scored his maiden first-class century against Hampshire at the end of the 2017 season, at the age of 19.

During the 2017/18 winter, he was selected for the ECB's overseas placement programme in Australia whereby he played for Campbelltown-Camden District Cricket Club in the NSW Premier Cricket.  Pope went on to score 994 runs, including 3 centuries, and even received a commendation in the New South Wales parliament for his on & off-field exploits from MP Chris Patterson, who was the club's vice-president. Pope's breakout year was 2018, when he hit 4 centuries and averaged 70.42 in Surrey's County Championship-winning campaign, and was awarded the PCA Young Player of the Year award. Pope's success continued into 2019, as he was the highest-scoring Surrey batsman in their first-class season with 812 runs at an average of 101, including 3 centuries, across only 9 innings.

Pope re-entered the Surrey side for nine matches of the 2021 County Championship after the Covid disrupted 2020 season, scoring 861 runs at an average of 78.27, including totals of 245 against Leicestershire and a career-best 274 against Glamorgan.

In April 2022, he was bought by the Welsh Fire for the 2022 season of The Hundred.

International career
Pope was added to England's squad for the second Test against India at Lord's, where he made his Test debut, on 9 August 2018. He made 28 in his only knock, as England won by an innings. Later that year, he was selected for England's tour of Sri Lanka. However, having played no part in England's first Test, he was released from the tour in order to join up with the England Lions for their game against Pakistan A in the UAE.

During a strong 2019 season, Pope was called up as cover for Jason Roy before the 3rd Ashes Test at Headingley. Although Roy was eventually passed fit to play, this saw him back in the International picture and a month later he was called up to the England Test squad to face New Zealand. In the second Test at Hamilton, Pope made 75 runs in England's only innings. Pope then toured South Africa but missed the first test through illness. He then top scored in the first innings of the second test with 61* and then followed this up with his maiden Test century for England in the third Test against South Africa in Port Elizabeth, with 135*.

On 29 May 2020, Pope was named in a 55-man group of players to begin training ahead of international fixtures starting in England following the COVID-19 pandemic. On 17 June 2020, Pope was included in England's 30-man squad to start training behind closed doors for the Test series against the West Indies. On 4 July 2020, Pope was named in England's thirteen-man squad for the first Test match of the series.

Pope played in all six Test matches of the 2020 England summer, scoring 215 runs at an average of 26.9 against Pakistan and the West Indies, including scores of 91 and 62. Due to a shoulder injury sustained during the Pakistan series, Pope was not included in the England squad for their 2021 tour of Sri Lanka, though he travelled with the tour party so that he could work on his fitness with the team's physiotherapist. He was also not originally included for England's 2021 tour of India, though again he accompanied the tour party, but was added after the England medical team were satisfied he had recovered sufficiently. Pope played in all four tests, scoring 153 runs at an average of 19.1, in England's 3–1 series defeat.

In England's 2021 series against New Zealand, Pope made 84 runs in 4 innings, with a highscore of just 23. Due to a quad injury, Pope only played in the fourth Test against India in their tour of England, making scores of 81 and 2. Pope was included in England's squad for the 2021-22 Ashes.

Pope was included in the England squad for the 2022 test series against New Zealand. In the second Test he made a career-best Test score of 145, which included 13 fours and 3 sixes.

Batting style 
Sachin Tendulkar, Brett Lee and Kevin Pietersen have compared Pope's technique to that of Ian Bell. Similiarites with Bell are often drawn to Pope's "elegant" cover drive, ability to rotate the strike, and "compact" technique.

References

External links

1998 births
Living people
Cricketers from Chelsea, London
England Test cricketers
English cricketers of the 21st century
English cricketers
North v South cricketers
People educated at Cranleigh School
Surrey cricketers
Welsh Fire cricketers